The 1967 Diamond "D" Championship the Canadian women's curling championship was held from February 27 to March 2, 1967 at the Town of Mount Royal Arena in Mount Royal, Quebec.

Team Manitoba, who was skipped by Betty Duguid won the event by finishing round robin play unbeaten with a 9–0 record. This was Manitoba's second championship in three years with Manitoba's previous title coming in 1965. This was the second consecutive championship in which the championship rink finished unbeaten and the fourth time overall.

Quebec's 14–13 victory Prince Edward Island in Draw 1 tied the record for the highest combined score by both teams in one game with 27. This tied the record set in 1963 as Ontario defeated New Brunswick by the same score.

This would also be the last women's championship that was sponsored by Dominion Stores as the tournament organizers were unable to reach a compromise with the sponsor.

Teams
The teams are listed as follows:

Round robin standings
Final Round Robin standings

Round robin results
All draw times are listed in Eastern Standard Time (UTC−05:00).

Draw 1 
Monday, February 27, 2:00 pm

Draw 2 
Monday, February 27, 8:00 pm

Draw 3 
Tuesday, February 28, 2:00 pm

Draw 4 
Tuesday, February 28, 8:30 pm

Draw 5 
Wednesday, March 1, 9:00 am

Draw 6 
Wednesday, March 1, 2:00 pm

Draw 7 
Wednesday, March 1, 8:30 pm

Draw 8 
Thursday, March 2, 2:00 pm

Draw 9 
Thursday, March 3, 8:30 pm

References

Diamond D Championship, 1967
Scotties Tournament of Hearts
Curling competitions in Montreal
Diamond D Championship
Diamond D Championship
Diamond D Championship
Diamond D Championship
Diamond D Championship
Mount Royal, Quebec
1960s in Montreal